Prijevor is a small village in Rijeka Dubrovačka, Dubrovnik-Neretva County, Croatia.

History 
 earthquake 1979.
 Croatian War of Independence 1991–1993.

Economy 
 tourism
 agriculture
 fishing

Demography 
 predominantly Croats

Populated places in Dubrovnik-Neretva County